Alagovac Lake is a lake in the municipality of Nevesinje, Bosnia and Herzegovina.

Lakes of Bosnia and Herzegovina